Bird of Paradise is a 1951 American adventure drama and romance film in Technicolor, produced and directed by Delmer Daves, and starring Debra Paget, Louis Jourdan, and Jeff Chandler. The screenplay was also written by Daves based on the 1912 play by Richard Walton Tully. The film was distributed by 20th Century-Fox.

Plot
Frenchman Andre Laurence accompanies his college roommate Tenga home to Polynesia. There, he learns how to surf and the cultural ways of the island population. He eventually falls in love with and marries Tenga's sister, Kalua. All is paradise until Andre falls under the disapproving glare of the Kahuna, who warns the islanders that Andre will poison their paradise with his evil White ways. When the island's volcano begins to erupt in endless lava flows, the Kahuna decrees that the gods can be appeased only by human sacrifice. One of them must be sacrificed to the gods, and Andre's wife, Kalua, is chosen.

The islanders gather to witness the sacrifice, all except Andre, who is ordered to remain in his hut. As the villagers watch, Kalua walks up the peak and leaps into the hellish maelstrom below. The volcano responds, and the island and its population are spared. The next day, Andre leaves paradise forever and returns to civilization.

Cast
 Debra Paget as Kalua
 Louis Jourdan as Andre Lawrence
 Jeff Chandler as Tenga
 Everett Sloane as The Akua
 Maurice Schwartz as The Kahuna
 Jack Elam as The Trader
 Prince Leilani as Chief
 Otto Waldis as Skipper
 Alfred Zeisler as Van Hook
Sterling Hayden had been mentioned as a possibility for the male lead.

This was Schwartz's second film role.

Production
20th Century Fox announced the film in May 1950. It reunited several personnel from Broken Arrow including Debra Paget, Delmer Daves and Jeff Chandler. Chandler joked that his character was just a variation on his performance as Cochise in Broken Arrow.
The story is really about a conflict of worlds in 1850: a primitive people who live by their beliefs and the civilization – in quotes – brought by the white man. The problem is never resolved; even marriage can't do it – but... we used some wonderful locations and the scenery is breathtakingly beautiful.

Daves claims that he wrote "a practically new story" from the earlier play.

The film was shot on location in Hawaii beginning in August 1950. Key locations were Hanalei Bay, Waikiki, Kona Coast and Volcano.

Chandler flew back Los Angeles every weekend in order to fulfill his radio commitment to Our Miss Brooks.

O'ahu native Queenie Ventura (née Dowsett), who was half pure Hawaiian and half Portuguese, joined the cast as a featured dancer and the local lead actress.

Reception
New York Times film critic Bosley Crowther panned the film, writing: "There is certainly nothing original—or particularly blissful, we would say—about the romantic tumble here taken by a visiting white man for a beauteous native maid...Unfortunately, Delmer Daves, who directed and wrote the script, either didn't or wasn't permitted to pitch the whole film in this slyly kidding vein. And the consequence is a rambling mishmosh of South Sea romance and travesty, of solemn high-priesting and low clowning, of never-never spectacle and sport".

Variety reviewed the film favorably, writing: "Richard Walton Tully's old legit piece, Bird of Paradise, makes another trip to the screen in a refurbished version. Previous filming of the play was in 1932 and, while Delmer Daves' version deviates from the Tully form, the essentials of the drama are still there, plus a beautiful Technicolor camera job, haunting island music and the use of actual locales...Paget hits a high level in her performance as the Princess Kalua. She, as well as the other players give their characters considerable sincerity. Jourdan is an excellent choice as the island visitor, as is Chandler as the prince."

References

External links
 
 
 
 

1950s adventure drama films
1951 drama films
1951 films
20th Century Fox films
American adventure drama films
Remakes of American films
American films based on plays
1950s English-language films
Films about interracial romance
Films directed by Delmer Daves
Films scored by Daniele Amfitheatrof
Films set in Oceania
Films about volcanoes
1950s American films
Films about witch doctors